Samson Yego (born 1 September 1971) is a Kenyan sprinter. He competed in the 4 × 400 metres relay at the 1996 Summer Olympics and the 2000 Summer Olympics.

References

1971 births
Living people
Athletes (track and field) at the 1996 Summer Olympics
Athletes (track and field) at the 2000 Summer Olympics
Kenyan male sprinters
Olympic athletes of Kenya
Place of birth missing (living people)